Major General Herbert Joseph McChrystal Jr. (May 30, 1924 – December 10, 2013) was an officer in the United States Army and the father of General Stanley A. McChrystal.

Early years and personal life
Herbert Joseph McChrystal Jr. was born in 1924 in the Panama Canal Zone to Colonel Herbert McChrystal, Sr. (1895–1954), who was stationed with the United States military and Hazel Marion (née Vosper) McChrystal. He married Mary Gardner Bright, with whom he had six children. Mary McChrystal died in 1971. He is a distant relative of Corporal Charles Edward  McChrystal, US Army Corporal and Purple Heart recipient, who died in France during World War II.

Career
McChrystal graduated from New Mexico Military Institute 1942 JC and the United States Military Academy in 1945, and was part of the occupying force in Germany after World War II. 

He served a tour of duty in Korea with the 15th Infantry Regiment, part of the 25th Infantry Division, and received his first Silver Star.

He served two tours of duty in Vietnam. During his first tour, he commanded the 2nd Battalion, 18th Infantry Regiment, part of the 1st Infantry Division. His second tour was in 1968; he commanded the 2nd Brigade of the 4th Infantry Division and then was chief of staff for the 4th Infantry Division.

In the early 1970s he was director of the Planning and Program Analysis Directorate at the Pentagon. His final posting was leading the Test and Evaluation Command at Fort Hood, Texas.

He retired from the military in 1974. His decorations included four Silver Stars, the Bronze Star Medal, the Distinguished Service Medal and the Combat Infantryman Badge.

Later life
After leaving the military, he spent four years as a political-military consultant to RAND Corporation, and worked for several years on the staff and faculty of the Florida Institute of Technology, where he also earned a Master of Business Administration. 

Later, he went on to form a logistics consultation firm with Nedra R. McChrystal, his third wife. 

McChrystal died on December 10, 2013, in Kingsport, Tennessee.

References

Sources
Times-News.net article on McChrystal
Time Feb. 22, 1982

1924 births
2013 deaths
United States Army generals
United States Army personnel of the Korean War
United States Army personnel of the Vietnam War
Recipients of the Distinguished Flying Cross (United States)
Recipients of the Distinguished Service Medal (US Army)
Recipients of the Legion of Merit
Recipients of the Silver Star
United States Military Academy alumni
Florida Institute of Technology alumni
Florida Institute of Technology faculty
American expatriates in Panama